U.S. Route 395 (US 395) is an  United States Numbered Highway near Lake Tahoe in the state of Nevada. It traverses the state after entering from California in Topaz Lake and crosses back into California near Hallelujah Junction. US 395 serves the cities of Gardnerville, Minden, Carson City and Reno. All of US 395 north of Carson City is a freeway and is built up to Interstate Highway standards. Part of the freeway section is also designated as Interstate 580 (I-580). US 395 is an important regional highway, serving the communities of Western Nevada, connecting them to other major communities via California, and it is the only major north–south arterial for the geographically isolated region.

Route description

US 395 enters Nevada in Topaz Lake as a two-lane highway and gradually winds its way to Carson Valley where it becomes the principal thoroughfare for the Gardnerville–Minden area. Upon entering the Carson Valley, US 395 becomes a four-lane highway through Gardnerville and Minden. Upon leaving Minden, the highway becomes a four-lane divided highway and turns due north towards Carson City.

At the south end of Carson City, the route intersects the southern terminus of I-580 and US 50. The three routes then continue on a freeway bypass around the east side of Carson City. US 50 departs from the freeway at East William Street, while I-580 and US 395 continue north through Carson City.

Upon exiting Carson City, the freeway continues north through Washoe Valley and crosses through the mountains west of Washoe City and Pleasant Valley before entering Reno. Upon entering Reno, the route is designated, since 1998, as the Martin Luther King Jr. Freeway. The freeway heads north to the I-80 interchange near Downtown Reno and I-580 ends here. Shortly afterward, US 395 turns northwest to serve the northern valleys of the Reno area before crossing back to California at the unincorporated Nevada community of Bordertown, in Cold Springs, Washoe County.

The entire route of US 395 through Nevada closely follows the eastern edge of the Sierra Nevada range. Several prominent peaks are visible from the highway, including Jobs Peak and Mount Rose.

History
Per Nevada Historical Marker number 124, located along the route near Minden, this portion of US 395 was originally built as a toll road called Boyd's Toll Road. The original state route designations for modern US 395 was SR 9 north of Reno, SR 3 Reno to Holbrook (at the modern junction of US 395 and SR 208) and SR 19 from there to the state line at Topaz Lake. The US 395 designation was added to the route by 1937. From the inception of the Interstate Highway system there were plans to upgrade the portion from Carson City to Reno to Interstate Highway standards, and while portions were improved, rerouted and rebuilt to a new freeway alignment starting in the 1960s, the road was not officially signed as Interstate 580 until 2012.

There were plans to extend the US 395 freeway from US 50 and the southern terminus of I-580 to SR 757 and Muller Lane.

The routing for I-580 and US 395 had been considered as a potential alignment for the extension of I-11 from US 95 north of Walker Lake to I-80 at the Spaghetti Bowl interchange in Reno.

Major intersections

Note: Mileposts in Nevada reset at county lines. The start and end mileposts for each county are given in the county column. Exits numbered according to statewide mileage.

Special routes

Current
 U.S. Route 395 Alternate, an alternate route between Carson City and Reno
 U.S. Route 395 Business, a business route in Carson City
 U.S. Route 395 Business, a little-signed business route in Reno

Former
 U.S. Route 395 Alternate, a former alternate route of US 395 on Sierra Street in Reno
 U.S. Route 395 Temporary, a former temporary route mostly on Kietzke Lane in Reno

See also

References

External links

 Floodgap Roadgap.com: The Three Flags Highway—U.S. 395

 Nevada
95-3
Transportation in Douglas County, Nevada
Transportation in Carson City, Nevada
Transportation in Washoe County, Nevada